The 1994 Mid-American Conference men's basketball tournament took place on March 8–10, 1994 at Battelle Hall in Columbus, Ohio. Ohio defeated , 89–66 in the championship game, to win its third MAC Tournament title.

The Bobcats earned an automatic bid to the 1994 NCAA tournament as #12 seed in the East region. In the round of 64 Ohio fell to Indiana, 84–72.

Format

Bracket

References

1991
Tournament
MAC men's basketball tournament
MAC men's basketball tournament